Fonoti may refer to:

 Fonoti of Aunuu, Fa'amatai title
 Fonoti (surname)
 Va'a-o-Fonoti, district in Samoa